Governors Bay is a small town in Canterbury, New Zealand.

Geography
The settlement of Governors Bay is located on Banks Peninsula near the head of Lyttelton Harbour. It is connected via Governors Bay Road to Lyttelton, via Dyers Pass Road over the Port Hills to the Christchurch suburb of Cashmere, and via Main Road to the south side of the harbour basin and Banks Peninsula.

Demographics 

Governors Bay had a population of 864 at the 2018 New Zealand census, an increase of 48 people (5.9%) since the 2013 census, and an increase of 63 people (7.9%) since the 2006 census. There were 339 households. There were 423 males and 441 females, giving a sex ratio of 0.96 males per female. The median age was 47.8 years (compared with 37.4 years nationally), with 159 people (18.4%) aged under 15 years, 105 (12.2%) aged 15 to 29, 462 (53.5%) aged 30 to 64, and 141 (16.3%) aged 65 or older.

Ethnicities were 95.8% European/Pākehā, 3.8% Māori, 1.4% Pacific peoples, 2.1% Asian, and 3.1% other ethnicities (totals add to more than 100% since people could identify with multiple ethnicities).

The proportion of people born overseas was 33.0%, compared with 27.1% nationally.

Although some people objected to giving their religion, 61.1% had no religion, 28.5% were Christian, 0.3% were Muslim, 0.3% were Buddhist and 4.2% had other religions.

Of those at least 15 years old, 297 (42.1%) people had a bachelor or higher degree, and 42 (6.0%) people had no formal qualifications. The median income was $46,700, compared with $31,800 nationally. The employment status of those at least 15 was that 384 (54.5%) people were employed full-time, 135 (19.1%) were part-time, and 15 (2.1%) were unemployed.

Amenities

Te Kura o Ōhinetahi | Governors Bay School in Jetty Road caters for students from year 0 to year 8. The school opened in 1868 and moved to the current site in 1963.

Cholmondeley Children's Centre in Cholmondeley Lane is a children's home providing short-term or emergency residential care for children, usually between the ages of 3–12 years, and support for their families. Ōtoromiro Hotel (previously known as Governors Bay Hotel), founded in 1870, is one of the oldest hotels in continuous operation in New Zealand. It remained open after the 2010 and 2011 earthquakes.

Heritage buildings

The Ohinetahi historic homestead, in Ohinetahi, is a Category I heritage building, and the associated formal garden is considered to be one of New Zealand's finest. A partnership of three purchased the property in 1977  and one of them, prominent Christchurch architect Sir Miles Warren, has lived in the property since soon afterwards. Damage from the September 2010 quake forced changes to lighten the upper story of the building. Sir Miles gifted the property  "to the nation" in early 2013.

St Cuthbert's Church in Governors Bay Road, built in 1860, is also a Category I building. It was extensively damaged in the September 2010 quake. The local community worked with the Church Property Trust to repair and restore the church and it was reopened in 2017. The church grounds contain the grave of Mary Elizabeth Small whose story is told in the children’s novel The Runaway Settlers.

The original 1868 Governors Bay School and the associated school house are both Category II heritage structures, significant because there are very few remaining school buildings from provincial government times. The school is located on land donated by Thomas Potts.

Notable residents

Leslie Kenton (1941–2016) American-born writer, journalist and entrepreneur
Margaret Mahy (1936–2012), author of children's and young adult books
Mary Elizabeth Small (1812–1908), market gardener and farmer, and the inspiration for Elsie Locke's 1965 children's novel The Runaway Settlers
Mona Tracy (1892–1959), children's novelist, journalist, poet, short-story writer, and community worker
Miles Warren (born 1929), architect

References

External links
 

Banks Peninsula
Populated places in Canterbury, New Zealand